Job Hilliard Lippincott (November 12, 1842 – July 5, 1900) was a lawyer who served as United States Attorney for the District of New Jersey and was an associate justice of the New Jersey Supreme Court.

Biography
He was born on November 12, 1842 near Mount Holly, New Jersey to a Quaker farmer and raised on the family farm in Vincentown, New Jersey. He attended Mount Holly Seminary. He is an 1865 graduate, with the degree of Bachelor of Laws, of the Dane Law School at Harvard University.

He was president of the board of education of Hudson City, New Jersey from 1868 to 1871. He married Keziah Budd on August 19, 1878 and they had a son, Job Herbert Lippincott.

Judicial Service
Lippincott was  United States Attorney for New Jersey from 1886 to 1887 and associate justice of the New Jersey Supreme Court from 1893 to 1900, replacing George Theodore Werts.

Death
He died at his home, at 132 Sip Avenue, Jersey City, New Jersey on July 5, 1900. He was interred in Mount Holly Cemetery.

See also
List of justices of the Supreme Court of New Jersey
New Jersey Court of Errors and Appeals
Courts of New Jersey

References

1842 births
1900 deaths
People from Southampton Township, New Jersey
New Jersey lawyers
Politicians from Jersey City, New Jersey
Harvard Law School alumni
United States Attorneys for the District of New Jersey
Justices of the Supreme Court of New Jersey
19th-century American judges
19th-century American lawyers